is a Japanese footballer. He is a defender.

He was educated at and played for Japan Soccer College before moving to Singapore.

He signed for Albirex Niigata FC (Singapore) from the S.League in 2017 having graduated from Japan Soccer College.

Club career statistics
As of Jan 2, 2017

External links

References

1997 births
Living people
Japanese footballers
Singapore Premier League players
Japan Soccer College players
Albirex Niigata Singapore FC players
Association football forwards